Coco is a surname. Notable people with the surname include:

 Angela Coco, Australian sociologist
 Ettore Coco (1908–1991), New York mobster
 Francesco Coco (born 1977), Italian retired football player
 Giuseppe Coco (1936–2012),  Italian comics artist and illustrator
 Jack Coco (born 1998), American football player
 James Coco (1930–1987), American actor
 Juanita Coco (1975–1993), Australian singer and actress
 Menzy Coco (born 1989), Mauritian footballer
 Saúl Coco, Equatoguinean footballer Saúl Basilio Coco-Bassey Oubiña (born 1999)